Oreshene refers to the following places in Bulgaria:

 Oreshene, Lovech Province
 Oreshene, Silistra Province